Prahaar ("Strike") is an Indian solid-fuel road-mobile tactical ballistic missile developed by the Defence Research and Development Organisation (DRDO). Prahaar is expected to replace the Prithvi-I short-range ballistic missile in Indian service.

Development 

Prahaar is developed to provide a cost-effective, quick-reaction, all-weather, all-terrain, highly accurate battlefield support tactical weapon system. The development of the missile was carried out by the DRDO scientists in a span of less than two years. The maneuvering capability, greater acceleration, better accuracy and faster deployment fills the short-range tactical battlefield role as required by the Indian Army to take out strategic and tactical targets. The mobile launch platform will carry six missiles that can be deployed in stand-alone and canisterised mode, which can have different kind of warheads meant for different targets and can be fired in salvo mode in all directions covering the entire azimuth plane.

This solid-fueled missile can be launched within 2–3 minutes without any preparation, providing significantly better reaction time than liquid-fueled Prithvi ballistic missiles and act as a gap filler in the  range, between the Pinaka Multi Barrel Rocket Launcher and Smerch MBRL in one end and the Prithvi ballistic missiles on the other.

As per Indian military experts, Prahaar is to counter weapon systems that can fall between 40 km to 150 km range such as Nasr. DRDO also confirmed that Prahaar is only for carrying out strikes in conventional warfare with no nuclear use.

Testing 
Prahaar was test-fired successfully on 21 July 2011 from the Integrated Test Range (ITR) at Chandipur.

On 20 September 2018, Prahaar was test fired for the second time from ITR, Chandipur.

Variants

Pragati 
The export variant of the system is the Pragati surface to surface missile. It was unveiled for the first time by DRDO at ADEX 2013 in Seoul, South Korea. Pragati has a higher range of 170 km and shares 95 percent of Prahaar's hardware components.

Pranash 
Due to limited 150 km (93 mi) range of Prahaar, the Indian Army wanted a new tactical ballistic missile with range of 200 km. The configuration of the new missile called Pranash has been frozen by DRDO with the developmental trials beginning from 2021. It will carry a conventional warhead, powered by single-stage solid propellant which will be offered for user trials within two years. India is looking for exporting this missile to friendly nations as it will come outside the purview of Missile Technology Control Regime (MTCR) which restricts export of delivery vehicle above 300 km range.

See also
 
IGMDP
Project Devil
Prithvi missiles
BM-30 Smerch
Pinaka Multi Barrel Rocket Launcher
Pralay (missile)

Comparable missile
Abdali-I
MGM-140 ATACMS
LORA (missile)
Nasr (missile)
KN-25

References

External links
 CSIS Missile Threat - Prahaar
 First test launch video of the missile

Technical:
 DRDO Technology Focus : Warhead for Missiles, Torpedoes and Rockets

Short-range ballistic missiles
Ballistic missiles of India
Defence Research and Development Organisation